The 2021 Rugby World Cup was the ninth staging of the women's Rugby World Cup, as organised by World Rugby. It was held from 8 October to 12 November 2022 in Auckland and Whangārei, New Zealand. It was originally scheduled to be held in 2021, but was postponed by one year due to the COVID-19 pandemic.

It was the first women's Rugby World Cup to be hosted by New Zealand, and by a country in the Southern Hemisphere. New Zealand were also the defending champions.

The tournament introduced changes such as replacement of classification play-offs in the knockout stage with quarter-finals, and a longer scheduling window with at least five days between matches. It was also the first to not be marketed by World Rugby as the "Women's Rugby World Cup", due to a decision to market both the men's and women's tournaments under the "Rugby World Cup" title with no disambiguation beginning in 2021.

Host selection 
On 14 November 2018, World Rugby announced that New Zealand would host the 2021 Women's Rugby World Cup, beating out a competing bid by Australia—the only other country to officially submit a bid for the tournament. It was the first Women's Rugby World Cup to be hosted by a country in the Southern Hemisphere.

In November 2019, World Rugby announced that in an effort to create greater parity between the men's and women's Rugby World Cup, the Women's Rugby World Cup would be marketed as the "Rugby World Cup" with no gender designation beginning with the 2021 tournament.

The tournament was originally scheduled to be held from 18 September to 16 October 2021. On 2 March 2021, World Rugby announced that the tournament would be postponed to 2022 due to the COVID-19 pandemic, as "it has become clear in recent discussions with key partners including New Zealand Rugby, the New Zealand government and participating unions, that, given the scale of the event and the COVID-19 related uncertainties, it is just not possible to deliver the environment for all teams to be the best that they can be on the sport's greatest stage." New Zealand's Zero-COVID policy at the time also meant that teams would have been subject to strict quarantine arrangements in order to enter the country, whose international borders were closed.

On 12 May 2021, it was announced that the tournament had been rescheduled to 8 October through 12 November 2022; the window of the tournament was also extended and realigned to allow for at least five days rest between matches, as with the men's Rugby World Cup. All matches were scheduled on weekends. The tournament remained branded as the "2021 Rugby World Cup", but with a "Playing in 2022" subtitle.

Venues 

The three venues are in the Auckland and Northland regions of Te Ika-a-Māui, the North Island. Three opening games were hosted at New Zealand's national stadium Eden Park. Eden Park also hosted the semi-finals, third place play-off and final. Other pool games and the quarter-finals were held at the Northland Events Centre and Waitakere Stadium.

Qualifying 

New Zealand, the host nation, had already qualified automatically winning the 2017 tournament before being announced as hosts. A further six teams (England, France, United States, Canada, Australia and Wales) qualified automatically as top seven finishers at the 2017 tournament. Scotland was announced as the winner of the repechage tournament on 25 February 2022.

Qualified teams

Match officials 
On 26 May 2022, World Rugby announced the team of 18 officials from 11 unions for the World Cup, including an "all-female team of referees."  English official Sara Cox served in her fourth World Cup, while South African official Aimee Barrett-Theron and Irish official Joy Neville adjudicates in their second World Cups.

On 21 September 2022, World Rugby released the list of appointments for the pool phase—New Zealander Maggie Cogger-Orr was selected to oversee the opening match of the tournament.

On 8 November 2022, World Rugby announced that Scottish referee Hollie Davidson would adjudicate the final.

Referees (9)
  Aimee Barrett-Theron
  Maggie Cogger-Orr
  Sara Cox
  Hollie Davidson
  Aurélie Groizeleau
  Lauren Jenner
  Amber McLachlan
  Clara Munarini
  Joy Neville

Assistants (5)
  Maria Beatrice Benvenuti
  Doriane Domenjo
  Tyler Miller
  Kat Roche
  Julianne Zussman

Television Match Officials (4)
  Chris Assmus
  Lee Jeffrey
  Ian Tempest
  Ben Whitehouse

Draw 
Seedings for the pools of the 2021 World Cup were based on the teams' World Rugby Rankings. The draw, hosted by sports pundit and former English and British and Irish Lions international Ugo Monye and sports journalist and presenter Elma Smit, was conducted on 20 November 2020 in the SkyCity Theatre in Auckland, and used the World Rankings as of 1 January 2020, before the global outbreak of the COVID-19 pandemic. This is the first case in which the Women's World Cup was drawn based on World Rankings instead of classification from the previous World Cup. The automatic qualifiers from 2017 were allocated to their respective bands based on their rankings – and the remaining 5 qualifying places were allocated to Bands 3 and 4 based on previous World Cup playing strength:

 Band 1, made up of the top 3 automatic qualifiers, (1–3)
 Band 2, made up of the next 3 automatic qualifiers, (4–6)
 Band 3, made up of the 7th automatic qualifier, Europe 1 and Africa 1
 Band 4, made up of Asia 1, Oceania 1 and Repechage winner

This meant the 12 teams, qualified and qualifiers, were seeded thus:

The pools were respectively drawn by New Zealand Prime Minister, Jacinda Ardern, former Black Ferns internationals, Melodie Robinson and Farah Palmer and former All Blacks international, Dan Carter.

Squads 

Each team submitted a squad of 32 players for the tournament.

Pool stage 

Each pool was a single round-robin of six games, in which each team played one match against each of the other teams in the same pool. Teams were awarded four points for a win, two points for a draw. A team that scored four or more tries earned a bonus point, as did a team that lost by fewer than eight points.

The tournament comprised twelve teams divided into three pools of four teams. The top two teams in each pool, as well as the best two third-placed teams progressed to the quarter-finals.

Fixtures were announced on 28 January 2021.

 Tie-breaking criteria

If two or more teams are tied on match points, the following tiebreakers applied;

 The winner of the match between the two teams
 Difference between points scored for and points scored against in all pool matches
 Difference between tries scored for and tries scored against in all pool matches
 Points scored in all pool matches
 Most tries scored in all pool matches

Pld = Number of games played; W = Number of games won; D = Number of games drawn; L = Number of games lost; TF = Number of tries scored (tries for); PF = Total number of points scored by the team (points for); PA = Total number of points scored against the team (points against); +/− = Points difference, PF−PA; BP = Bonus pool points; Pts = Total number of pool points

Pool A

Pool B

Pool C

Ranking of qualified teams

Knockout stage

Quarter-finals

Semi-finals

Third-place play-off

Final

Statistics 

Last updated: 12 November 2022

Points scorers

Try scorers

Broadcasting 
Spark Sport will be the host broadcaster for the Rugby World Cup, broadcasting all matches live and on demand through its online streaming platform. Three will broadcast a selection of games free-to-air on New Zealand television.

 : Stan Sport and Nine Network
 : TSN and RDS
 : TF1
 : Eir Sport and RTÉ
 : RAI and Sky Sport
 : Spark Sport and Three
 : SuperSport
 : Movistar Plus+
 : ITV
 : NBC Sports and TUDN

See also 
 2023 Rugby World Cup (men's)
 2022 Rugby World Cup Sevens (separate tournaments for men and women as part of a single event)

References

External links 
 

 
2021
2022 rugby union tournaments for national teams
2022 in women's rugby union
Rugby World Cup
International women's rugby union competitions hosted by New Zealand
Rugby World Cup
Rugby World Cup
Rugby union events postponed due to the COVID-19 pandemic
Rugby World Cup
2022 in Australian rugby union
2022–23 in Welsh rugby union
2022–23 in Scottish rugby union
2022 in Canadian rugby union
2022 in American rugby union
2022–23 in Italian rugby union
2022–23 in Japanese rugby union
2022–23 in English rugby union
2022–23 in French rugby union
2022 in South African rugby union
2022 in Fijian rugby union